George Barlow may refer to:

 George Barlow (MP), Member of Parliament (MP) for Haverfordwest
 George Barlow (poet) (1847 –  1913), English poet, who sometimes wrote under the pseudonym James Hinton
 George H. Barlow (1921–1979), United States federal judge
 George Hilaro Barlow (physician) (1806–1866), English physician and first editor of Guy's Hospital Reports
 Sir George Barlow, 1st Baronet (1763–1846), acting Governor-General of British India 1805–07
 Sir George Barlow, 2nd Baronet (c. 1680–1726), British landowner and politician
 George Barlow (footballer, born 1885), British footballer
 George Barlow (footballer, born 1914), British footballer player
 George Barlow (American poet) (born 1948), American poet
 George Barlow (American football) (born 1967), American football coach
 George Barlow (soccer) (born 1933), Australian footballer
 George W. Barlow (1929–2007), American ichthyologist